Henosepilachna vigintisexpunctata, common name twenty-six-spotted potato ladybird, is a ladybird species.

References

Coccinellidae
Taxa named by Jean Baptiste Boisduval
Beetles described in 1835